George Kåhre (26 August 1899, in Mariehamn – 12 December 1969) was a teacher and author in Åland, Finland. He wrote poetry and prose, as well as factual books.

Kåhre debuted in 1928 with the poetry anthology Staden med de tusen lindarna, released under the pseudonym Stefan Sylwander. He would use this pseudonym until 1933, when his first novel, Strandhugg, was released under his own name. The novel won a shared first prize in a contest organized by a Swedish publisher.

Kåhre's most famous work in English is probably The Last Tall Ships: Gustav Erikson and the Åland Sailing Fleets 1872–1947, a translation of Den åländska segelsjöfartens historia (first published in 1940 by Åland Maritime Museum), which was released posthumously in 1978.

Two poetry anthologies, Ord och vågor and Söndag i världen, were released after his death.

Bibliography

Poetry, as Stefan Sylwander
Staden med de tusen lindarna (1928)
Vers från havskanten (1929)
Fromma visor (1930)
Väderilar (1932)

Poetry, as Georg Kåhre
Dikt och pamflett (1939)
Ord och vågor (1970)
Söndag i världen (1983)

Novels
Strandhugg (1933)
Bror Ahasverus (1942)
Knutar på fånglinan (1953)

Others
Den åländska segelsjöfartens historia (1940), English edition: The Last Tall Ships: Gustav Erikson and the Åland Sailing Fleets 1872–1947 (1978)
Ålands ömsesidiga försäkringsbolag (1941)
Ålands aktiebank (1944)
Under Gustaf Eriksons flagga (1948)
Sjöfart och skeppsbyggeri på Åland (1949)
Ålands redarförening r.f. 1934–1959 (1959)
Åland (1959)
50 år under Gustav Eriksons flagga (1963)

References

External links
 George Kåhre Biography, Library of Mariehamn

1899 births
1969 deaths
People from Mariehamn
People from Turku and Pori Province (Grand Duchy of Finland)
Writers from Åland
Finnish writers in Swedish